Jasola Apollo is a Delhi Metro station in Delhi. It is located between Harkesh Nagar Okhla and Sarita Vihar stations on the Violet Line.

History
The station was opened with the first section of the Line on 3 October 2010 in time for the Commonwealth Games opening ceremony on the same day.

This station is named to denote its vicinity to the nearby Jasola area and Indraprastha Apollo hospital. The station is spread in a relatively big area and is connected to the Apollo hospital via a huge foot-over-bridge.

The station

Station layout

Facilities
The station also houses several ATMs, food kiosks and a book store run by WHSmith.
List of available ATM at Jasola Apollo metro station are IndusInd Bank, Ratnakar Bank

Entry/Exit

Connections
It is located on Mathura road. A nearby "kos-minar" (kos is an Indian unit of distance) belonging to Sher-shah suri sultanate is visible from the balcony of this station.

See also

Delhi
Govindpuri
List of Delhi Metro stations
Transport in Delhi
Delhi Metro Rail Corporation
Delhi Suburban Railway
Delhi Monorail
Delhi Transport Corporation
South East Delhi
New Delhi
National Capital Region (India)
List of rapid transit systems
List of metro systems

References

External links

 Delhi Metro Rail Corporation Ltd. (Official site) 
 Delhi Metro Annual Reports
 
 UrbanRail.Net – Descriptions of all metro systems in the world, each with a schematic map showing all stations.

Delhi Metro stations
Railway stations opened in 2010
Railway stations in South Delhi district